Kristin Naca (born Washington, D.C.) is a Latina and Fillipina American poet.

Life and education
Naca grew up in northern Virginia.
She has a B.A. from the University of Washington, an MFA from the University of Pittsburgh, and a Ph.D. in English from University of Nebraska.

Her poems have appeared in Poetry, ART PAPERS Bloom, Harpur Palate, Indiana Review, Prairie Schooner, Octopus Magazine, Seattle Review, Poetry Northwest, and Rio Grande Review.

Naca is a member of the prestigious Macondo Writers Workshop, the workshop founded by Sandra Cisneros.

She served as Writer In Residence with Minnesota Prison Writing Workshops. She lives in Minneapolis.

Firing and subsequent lawsuit against Macalester College 
In 2015, Naca was fired from her position as an Assistant Professor of Poetry at Macalester College due to alleged sexual misconduct reported by a former student. Naca sued Macalester in 2016, arguing that her firing was for discriminatory reasons, due to a disability and her status as a woman, a lesbian, a Filipina and Puerto Rican, and a Santeria priestess. In 2018, the judge in the case cleared Macalester of wrongdoing in the dismissal. On January 16, 2020, the Eighth Circuit Court of Appeals affirmed the lower court's dismissal of the lawsuit, holding that "[e]ven assuming Naca made a prima facie case, this court concludes, on de novo review, that Macalester articulates a legitimate, non-discriminatory reason for termination—her sexual relationship with Doe—that Naca does not counter with sufficient evidence of pretext".

Awards
 mtvU National Poetry Series Prize. selected by Yusef Komunyakaa
 2008 National Poetry Series
 Lannan Residency Fellowship
 Bread Loaf Fellowship
 Hedgebrook women writers in residence program on Whidbey Island

Works
 "Baptism", The Blind Chatelaine's Keys
 
 , a Lambda Literary Award Finalist in 2010

References

Year of birth missing (living people)
Living people
Poets from Washington, D.C.
University of Cincinnati alumni
University of Pittsburgh alumni
University of Nebraska alumni
American lesbian writers
American LGBT poets
American women poets
American Santeríans
21st-century American women writers